Richard Tass is an American politician and former Wyoming state legislator. A member of the Republican Party, Tass represented the 40th district in the Wyoming House of Representatives from 2019 to 2021.

Early life
Tass was born in Buffalo, Wyoming.

Education
Tass earned an associate degree from Casper College in 1966.

Military career
Tass served in the United States Army during the Vietnam War.

Professional career
On November 6, 2018, Tass was elected to the Wyoming House of Representatives where he represents the 40th district. He won with 60.1% of the vote. Tass assumed office on January 7, 2019. On August 18, 2020, when Tass, sought re-election, he was defeated by Barry Crago in the Republican primary. Tass's term expired on January 4, 2021.

Personal life
Tass is Catholic. Tass has two children and four grandchildren. Tass is a member of the National Rifle Association.

References

Living people
People from Buffalo, Wyoming
Catholics from Wyoming
United States Army personnel of the Vietnam War
Military personnel from Wyoming
Republican Party members of the Wyoming House of Representatives
Casper College alumni
21st-century American politicians
Year of birth missing (living people)